The siege of Dunkirk in World War II (also known as the Second Battle of Dunkirk) began in September 1944, when Allied units of the Second Canadian Division surrounded the fortified city and port of Dunkirk. The siege lasted until after the official end of the war in Europe. German units within the fortress withstood probing attacks and as the opening of the port of Antwerp was more important, the 21st Army Group commander, Field Marshal Bernard Montgomery, decided to contain but not capture Dunkirk with the 1st Czechoslovak Armoured Brigade. The fortress, commanded by Admiral Friedrich Frisius, eventually surrendered unconditionally to Brigadier General Alois Liška, the commander of the Czechoslovak brigade group, on 9 May 1945, a day after the surrender of Nazi Germany took effect.

Background
The First Canadian Army had been allocated the left of the 21st Army Group line of advance and Field Marshal Bernard Montgomery had directed them to clear the Channel ports before continuing into the Netherlands. Most of the ports had been fortified and despite the generally poor quality of the garrisons, it was necessary to capture them with set-piece attacks.

The ports were needed to supply the Allied armies and the lack of such facilities had halted or slowed much offensive activity. Montgomery had estimated that the Channel ports would be sufficient for his needs and this view persisted until mid-September. Under orders from Dwight Eisenhower, the Allied Supreme Commander, Montgomery modified his instructions to the Canadian commander, Henry Crerar, on 13–14 September, "Early use of Antwerp so urgent that I am prepared to give up operations against Calais and Dunkirk" and "Dunkirk will be left to be dealt with later; for the present it will be merely masked".

Action against Calais continued in Operation Undergo, at least partly due to the need to silence the heavy artillery sited nearby. The forces that might have been used to capture Dunkirk were released for the Battle of the Scheldt and thus open access to the largely undamaged port of Antwerp. Instead, smaller Allied forces held a perimeter around the city.

Prelude
In the first weeks of the siege, while Allied forces were being deployed on the Scheldt, several formations took short turns at containing Dunkirk. The 5th Canadian Infantry Brigade, part of the 2nd Canadian Division, was relieved by the 4th Special Service Brigade (4th SSB, a Royal Marines Commando formation), which was in turn relieved by the 154th Infantry Brigade. The bulk of the siege was performed by the 1st Czechoslovak Armoured Brigade from early October until the final surrender. The German garrison consisted of a wide variety of men, including Navy and Air Force personnel, as well as Army and Fortress units. There was also a 2,000 strong Waffen-SS detachment. The total strength was in excess of 10,000 men. Many of these were remnants of five army divisions which had been mauled during the Normandy campaign and had retreated to Dunkirk. The town itself was heavily fortified and well-supplied for a lengthy siege.

The Canadians approached Dunkirk from the south-west. The German outer perimeter ran through the villages of Mardyck, Loon-Plage, Spycker, Bergues and Bray-Dunes,  from Dunkirk. The Calgary Highlanders attacked Loon-Plage on 7 September against very heavy opposition and suffered enough casualties that each of its companies was reduced to less than 30 men. The village was gained on the 9th only when the Germans withdrew. Over the next ten days, Canadian units nibbled away at the German perimeter, taking Coppenaxfort on the 9th, Mardyck on the 17th, both west of the city, Bergues on the 15th and Veurne, Nieuwpoort (greatly aided by precise intelligence received from the Belgian White Brigade, the national resistance movement) and De Panne, east of Dunkirk, in Belgium. Bray Dunes and nearby Ghyvelde, both just within France, were taken on 15 September, with air support after initial attacks had failed.

It had become clear that the German defenders could not be expelled without a major assault. Given the need to open up the Scheldt estuary to Antwerp and the likelihood that Dunkirk would be of limited use as a supply port as a result of its demolition, the major Canadian units were redeployed. Nearby Oostende had fallen easily to the Canadians when the Germans withdrew, and its port was partially opened on 28 September, easing the Allies' supply problems. Dunkirk was no longer worth the effort of its capture.

Siege
The Allied forces around Dunkirk were to contain the German garrison and minimise their inclination to fight on by reconnaissance, artillery and air bombardment and with propaganda. Coastal supply routes used by E-boats of the German navy and air supply drops were to be cut off. Of all of the German fortress garrisons on the Channel coast, Dunkirk appears to have been the most resilient. The garrison thwarted early probes by the Canadians with sufficient aggression to dissuade them from a full assault. By this stage, other priorities compelled the Canadians to persist in patrolling and local counter-attacks. On 16 September, the 2nd Canadian Infantry Division was relieved by the 4th SSB. On the night of 26/27 September, the 4th SSB was replaced by the 154th Infantry Brigade, 51st (Highland) Infantry Division. The Germans attempted to take advantage of the change with sorties against the 7th Black Watch in Ghyvelde and against 7th Argylls at nearby Bray-Dunes Plage. Both attacks were repulsed but only after the Argyll headquarters had been partially occupied and houses in Ghyvelde had been destroyed. A truce was negotiated from 3 to 6 October, at the initiative of the French Red Cross, to allow the evacuation of 17,500 French civilians and Allied and German wounded. The truce was extended to allow the Germans to restore defences that had been removed to allow the evacuation.

On 9 October, the 1st Czechoslovak Armoured Brigade (Major-General Alois Liška), took over the siege. The Czechs executed frequent harassing raids into the eastern suburbs to take prisoners; an attack on 28 October (Czechoslovak independence day) took 300 prisoners. There was a flurry of attacks and counter-attacks, mostly on the eastern perimeter during November 1944. Conditions on both sides were difficult in the winter. The low-lying ground outside the city had been flooded to form part of the defences and adjacent land easily became water-logged, hampering movement and making life unpleasant. Canadian gunners reported that gun-pits needed to be bailed out, the sides of dugouts collapsed and transport became mired. Czechoslovak morale was maintained by leave in nearby towns and in Lille. The defenders were stuck with poor food, deficient health care and harsh discipline.

On 28 April and 2 May 1945 the Germans were able to deliver a limited amount of supplies to the garrison with some of their 28 Seehund two-man midget submarines. These craft were normally armed with two torpedoes mounted on the outside. For the supply missions, the torpedoes were replaced with special food containers ("butter torpedoes"). On the return voyages they used the containers to carry mail from the Dunkirk garrison.

Surrender

The garrison surrendered unconditionally to Liška on 9 May 1945, two days after the surrender of Nazi Germany was signed and one day after it became effective.

Orders of battle

Allied forces
 5th Canadian Infantry Brigade (until 18 September)
 The Black Watch (Royal Highland Regiment) of Canada
 Le Régiment de Maisonneuve
 The Calgary Highlanders
 5th Canadian Infantry Brigade Ground Defence Platoon (Lorne Scots)
 4th Special Service Brigade (until 26 September)
 154th British Infantry Brigade (from 26 September – 9 October 1944)
 7th Battalion Argyll and Sutherland Highlanders
 1st and 7th Battalions Black Watch
 1st Czechoslovak Armoured Brigade (9 October – 9 May 1945)
 1st Czechoslovak Tank Battalion
 2nd Czechoslovak Tank Battalion
 1st Czechoslovak Motorised Infantry Battalion (two companies)
 Field Artillery Regiment (two battalions)
 Anti-tank battalion
 Armoured Reconnaissance Squadron
 Field Engineers Company
 Attached British, French and Canadian units
 7th Royal Tank Regiment
 2nd Canadian Heavy Anti-aircraft Regiment
 109th Heavy Anti-aircraft Regiment, Royal Artillery
 125th Light Anti-aircraft Regiment, Royal Artillery
 French 51st Infantry Regiment (two battalions formed from the FFI)

German garrison
Elements of:
 49th Infantry Division
 226th Infantry Division
 346th Infantry Division
 711th Infantry Division
 97th Infantry Division
 26th Fortress Battalion
 1046th Fortress Battalion
 Waffen-SS Reinecke group

See also
 Operation Astonia: capture of Le Havre
 Operation Wellhit: capture of Boulogne
 Operation Undergo: capture of Calais

Notes

Footnotes

Sources

Further reading

External links
 Dunkirk May 1945 German Surrender to Czechoslovak Brigade (BBC People's War) a detailed account
 VHU Praha : handbill also archived in Prague. Document "WARNUNG ! An die deutschen Truppen in Dünkirchen ! ..." 

Military history of France during World War II
Battles and operations of World War II involving Czechoslovakia
Battles of World War II involving Canada
Battles of World War II involving France
Sieges involving Germany
Battles and operations of World War II involving Germany
Battles in Hauts-de-France
Siege
History of Nord (French department)
Dunkirk 1944-45